Alan Gale, also known as Butch Gale (8 September 1930 – 24 March 1987), was an Australian rules footballer who played for Fitzroy in the VFL during the 1950s.

Career 

Gale made his league debut in 1948, at the age of just 17, after being recruited from the Police Boys' football club. His early games suggested that he was little more than an honest trier. However, as his career entered into the 1950s, Gale elevated his performances to a new, higher level. During this period, Gale finished runner-up in the clubs best and fairest award a record seven times, but never won, depriving him of an opportunity to be remembered as a great player on Fitzroy's honour board.

Some of Gale's best football came while resting in defence, and he would undoubtedly have made a fine key position defender had Fitzroy been able to spare him from the ruck.

Gale captained Fitzroy from 1958 until his retirement in 1961. He also represented Victoria in interstate football, leading them in 1959. He was named in Fitzroy's official 'Team of the Century'.

Following his retirement, Gale became a commentator on HSV7, partnering with Mike Williamson and Ted Whitten on match commentary through the 1960s and 1970s. Gale collapsed and died of a heart attack while addressing Fitzroy players in the week prior to the opening game of the 1987 VFL season.

Career highlights 

 On 3 May 2001, Gale was named in Fitzroy's Team of the Century, as the ruckman.
 In 2007, The Brisbane Lions recognised Gale as one of the ten greatest Lions players from the era 1957 to 1966.

Playing career:
 Fitzroy 1948–1961 (Games 213; Goals 19; Brownlow votes 30)

Player honors:
 12th Brownlow Medal 1957.
 Fitzroy captain: 1958 to 1961.
 Fitzroy Best & Fairest runner-up: 7 times
 Victorian representative: 12 games

See also 
 Fitzroy FC honour roll
 Australian rules footballers with 200 games for one club

References

External links
 
 

1930 births
1987 deaths
Australian rules footballers from Victoria (Australia)
Fitzroy Football Club players
Australian rules football commentators
Australian television personalities